East Harlsey is a village and civil parish in the Hambleton District of North Yorkshire, England. The population of the village as measured at the 2011 census was 281.

Within the village there is a pub called the 'Cat and Bagpipes'.

Harlsey Hall manor house is in the centre of the village: the manor was the property of the Lascelles family from the 11th century until 1654, when it passed to the Trotter Bannerman family, and from 1825, to the Maynard family.

Comedian Roy 'Chubby' Brown has a home at Harlsey Manor, to the east of East Harlsey.

Sport
East Harlsey has a cricket team, the first record of which is from 1908. The club provides teams for the Langbaurgh League and Northallerton and District Evening League, as well as competing in a number of local cup competitions.

See also
Mount Grace Priory

References

External links

East Harlsey village website
East Harlsey cricket club

Villages in North Yorkshire
Civil parishes in North Yorkshire